Kristi may refer to:

Kristi (given name), a proper name
Kristi language, a Portuguese creole language spoken in India
Kristi Noem, a United States Governor